The Queen's Theatre in London was established in 1867 as a theatre on the site of St Martin's Hall, a large concert room that had opened in 1850. It stood on the corner of Long Acre (formerly Charles Street) and Endell Street, with entrances in Wilson Street and Long Acre. The site is within the modern Camden, part of Covent Garden.

St Martin's Hall contained a 3,000-seat main hall and a 500-seat lecture hall. It was used for musical recitals, lectures and political meetings. The Queen's Theatre, one of the largest in London, had a capacity of 4,000 seats. The theatre closed after barely more than a decade, in 1878.

The name Queen's Theatre has been used for other theatres in central London, including the Queen's Theatre, Dorset Garden (from 1685 to 1705), Her Majesty's Theatre (from 1705 to 1714), Scala Theatre (during the period 1831–1865) and the modern Queen's Theatre in Shaftesbury Avenue (since 1907).

History

St Martin's Hall
St Martin's Hall was built for John Hullah, in 1847, by William Cubitt, from a design by Richard Westmacott. It was built in the Elizabethan style, with a large domed iron roof. The music hall was capable of seating 3,000 persons and was opened in 1850 by Hullah, the founder of a new "school of choral harmony". In addition to his singing classes, Hullah directed oratorios and concerts, both instrumental and vocal, at the hall. The hall was then used for musical recitals, lectures and political meetings.

The German Reed Entertainments were initially presented here in 1855 – known as "Miss P. Horton's Illustrative Gatherings" – before moving to the more intimate Gallery of Illustration and later St George's Hall. Charles Dickens first appeared as a public lecturer in St Martin's Hall, in April, 1858, speaking on behalf of the Hospital for Sick Children, in Great Ormond Street. A week or two later, he spoke on his own account.

On 26 August 1860, a fire broke out in a nearby coach factory and the hall was destroyed, together with its organ. The hall was rebuilt as a concert hall, opening in 1862. The First International was founded in St Martin's Hall in 1864. The final musical entertainment was given in 1867.

Queen's theatre
In 1867, a 4,000-seat theatre was built within the shell of the existing building by C. J. Phipps for Henry Labouchère and his partners, with interior decoration by Albert Moore and Telbin. A new company of players was formed, including Charles Wyndham, Henry Irving, J. L. Toole, Lionel Brough, Ellen Terry and Henrietta Hodson. The theatre opened as the New Queen's Theatre, with a production of Charles Reade's The Double Marriage on 24 October 1867.  An early success was Dearer Than Life, by H. J. Byron, with Brough, Toole, Wyndham, Hodson and Irving, coupled with W. S. Gilbert's La Vivandière, a burlesque of La fille du régiment.  The theatre continued with melodrama, adaptions and classic revivals, dropping the epithet 'new' the following year.

Initially, the management was run by the actor Alfred Wigan, who also appeared in its productions. By 1868, Hodson and Labouchère were living together out of wedlock, as they could not marry until her first husband finally died in 1887. Labouchère bought out his partners and used the theatre to showcase Hodson's talents. The theatre hosted comedies, such as F. C. Burnand's The Turn of the Tide (1869, starring Hermann Vezin and George Rignold with Hodson), historical dramas, such as Tom Taylor's Twixt Axe and Crown (1870), popular revivals of Shakespeare (starring such famous actors as Samuel Phelps) and Tommaso Salvini, dramatisations of Dickens novels, burlesques and extravaganzas. Although the theatre was among the largest and best equipped in London, and featured some of London's most famous stars, it lacked the guidance of an actor-manager of the stature of Henry Irving or Herbert Beerbohm Tree.

In 1877, the theatre became the National Theatre and hosted a series of promenade concerts under Riviere and Alfred Cellier followed by an ambitious dramatisation of The Last Days of Pompeii (Lord Lytton's eponymous novel) that was meant to feature a staged eruption of Vesuvius, an earthquake and a sybriatic Roman feast.  However, the earth did not quake, the volcano did not erupt, acrobats fell onto the cast below, and the production was an expensive flop. The same year, the theatre was joined by overhead wires to the Canterbury Music Hall in Lambeth, and public demonstrations of the Cromwell Varley telephone were given. Several simple tunes were transmitted and emitted softly from a large drum-like apparatus suspended over the proscenium.

The theatre was open for little more than a decade, closing in April 1878.  The interior was converted into a department store for the "Clerical Co-operative Society" and later occupied by the Odhams Press. The façade remained until redeveloped into a residential block in the 1970s.

Notes

References
Earl, John and Michael Sell. Guide to British Theatres 1750–1950, pp. 249 (Theatres Trust, 2000) 
Sherson, Erroll.  London's Lost Theatres of the Nineteenth Century, Chapter IX (Ayer Publishing, 1925) 
Queen's Theatre (Arthur Lloyd theatre history site)

External links
Description of the theatre at the Victorian London site

Entertainment in London
Former theatres in London
Former buildings and structures in the London Borough of Camden
1847 establishments in England
Theatres completed in 1850
1879 disestablishments in England
Charles J. Phipps buildings
Covent Garden